Oradea Airport  is an international airport located  southwest of Oradea in northwestern Romania, Bihor County, near one of the main road and rail border crossings to Hungary. Its location near the European route E60 and the future Transylvania motorway as well as the county's high tourist potential (Băile Felix hot springs, Padiş Natural Protected Area etc.) have led to a double digit growth of passenger and cargo traffic for the past two years.

Since its renovation, the airport has been regarded as in a competition with the relatively close airports of Debrecen (82 km away, in Hungary) and Cluj-Napoca (165 km).

Development and history
In 2009, Bihor County contracted consultancy services regarding the extension of the runway, the construction of a cargo terminal, and the renovation of the passenger terminal. The airport terminal is now renovated to EU (and Schengen) standards, and offers various specific facilities and modern amenities such as car rental, exchange offices, various shops, etc.

Regarding the runway (and other connected facilities), the Bihor County Commission completed the final contractual formalities with the EU Commission representatives, as this type of infrastructure work was eligible for European funds. A €30 million financing agreement for the EU funds was signed on 7 February 2014. Works on the new  runway, two rapid-exit taxiways and other facility buildings began on 20 October 2014. Concerning the cargo area, the Bihor County Commission has budgeted the resources needed for the first part of the project.

The construction works for the runway modernization were completed on 30 October 2015.

Airlines and destinations
The following airlines operate regular scheduled and charter flights at Oradea Airport:

Statistics

Other use

Military
Since April 2009, the NATO Centre of Excellence in Oradea is a member of NATO's Centres of Excellence (COE) network.  All aircraft involved in Oradea's NATO Centre of Excellence activities utilize the Oradea International Airport.

Air ambulance
A MEDIVAC helicopter is based at Oradea International Airport. It is operated by the Pelican Hospital's Emergency Service. It serves Bihor, Sălaj, Satu Mare, Maramureș and Arad Counties Emergency Services. The air ambulance transports persons to Level I trauma centers located in Bucharest.

Accidents and incidents
 On 4 February 1970, an Antonov 24B operated by TAROM crashed into the mountains near Oradea while inbound from Bucharest Otopeni International. 14 out of the 15 people on board died.
 On 27 May 1971, an Ilyushin 14 operated by TAROM was hijacked after departure from Oradea. The hijackers demanded to go to Austria where they surrendered.
 On 20 September 1994 an Antonov An-26 of the Romanian Air Force, registration 508 was written off  in a takeoff accident at Oradea. During the takeoff roll, the flight engineer (student) retracted the landing gear before the captain's order.
 On 16 January 2009, a Gulfstream G200, operated by Ion Ţiriac Air was damaged after it overran the runway. The aircraft suffered damage to the nose and the landing gear was broken. All 12 occupants were reported as having survived and suffered no injuries. The aircraft came to a halt near the fence surrounding the airport

Ground transportation
Oradea Transport Local provides a bus service (No.28) between Oradea International Airport and the city centre of Oradea. The price of a ticket is 6 RON. The timetable of this route is adjusted to the arrivals and departures of the flights. Currently the bus route is suspended from 28 March 2020 and an exact date of the restart is not available. Cabs/taxis are also available. The price of a ride to the city centre is about 30 RON.

See also
Aviation in Romania
Transport in Romania

References

External links
 Official website
 Google Map – Aerial View
 

Airports in Romania
Buildings and structures in Bihor County
Airports established in 1936
Oradea